This article lists the principal mountain passes and tunnels in the Alps, and gives a history of transport across the Alps.

Main passes

The following are the main paved road passes across the Alps. Main indicates on the main chain of the Alps, from south west to east. Passes on subsidiary ranges are listed where the ridge leaves the main chain – N/W indicates north or west of the main chain, S/E on the south or east side. Heights in brackets indicate true pass height, not the high point of the road.

Other passes
Detailed lists of passes are given by Alpine subdivision, see the following articles:

Western Alps
Ligurian Alps
Maritime Alps
Cottian Alps
Dauphiné Alps
Graian Alps
Pennine Alps
Bernese Alps
Lepontine Alps
Tödi Range
North-Eastern Swiss Alps
Eastern Alps
Northern Limestone Alps
The Alps of Bavaria, the Vorarlberg, and Salzburg
Central Eastern Alps
Bergamo Alps
Rhaetian Alps, including Bernina Range, Livigno Range, Sesvenna Range, Albula Range, Silvretta and Rätikon
Verwall Alps and Samnaun Alps
Tyrolean Alps, including Ötztal Alps, Stubai Alps, Kitzbühel Alps, Hohe Tauern and Zillertal Alps
Niedere Tauern
Southern Limestone Alps
Adamello-Presanella and Brenta Group
Ortler Alps
Dolomites
Carnic Alps
Julian Alps
Karavanke
Kamnik Alps

Road tunnels

Main chain, from west to east:

Notable other tunnels:

Railway passes and tunnels

Main chain, from west to east:

Notable other railway passes and tunnels:

History
Places where the Alps were crossed are called passes, and are points at which the alpine chain sinks to form depressions, up to which deep-cut valleys lead from the plains & hilly pre-mountainous zones. The oldest names for such passes are Mont (still retained in cases of Mont Cenis and Monte Moro), for it was many ages before this term was applied to mountains themselves, which with a few very rare exceptions (e.g. Monte Viso was known to the Romans as Vesulus) were for a long time disregarded.

Native inhabitants of the Alps were naturally the first to use the passes. The passes first became known to the outside world when the Romans crossed them to raid or conquer the region beyond. Romans, once having found an "easy" way across the chain, did not trouble to seek for harder and more devious routes.  Hence, passes that can be shown as certainly known to them are relatively few in number: they are, in topographical order from west to east, the Col de l'Argentière, the Col de Montgenèvre, the Col du Mont Cenis, the two St Bernard passes (Little St Bernard Pass and Great St Bernard Pass), the Splügen Pass, the Septimer Pass, the Reschen Pass, the Brenner Pass, the Plöcken Pass, the Pontebba Pass (or Saifnitz Pass), the  Radstädter Tauern Pass and the Solkscharte Pass or Sölk Pass.

Of these the Montgenèvre and the Brenner were the most frequented. In the Central Alps only two passes (the Splügen and the Septimer) were certainly known to the Romans.  In fact the central portion of the Alps was by far the least Romanised region until the early Middle Ages. Thus the Simplon is first definitely mentioned in 1235, the St Gotthard in 1236, the Lukmanier in 965, the San Bernardino in 941; of course they may have been known before, but authentic history is silent as regards them till the dates specified.  Even the Mont Cenis (from the 15th to the 19th century the favourite pass for travellers going from France to Italy) is first heard of only in 756.

In the 13th century many hitherto unknown passes came into prominence, even some of the easy glacier passes. In the Western and Central Alps there is only one ridge to cross, to which access is gained by a deep-cut valley, though often it would be shorter to cross a second pass in order to reach the plains, e.g. the Montgenèvre, that is most directly reached by the Col du Lautaret; and the Simplon, which is best reached by one of the lower passes over the western portion of the Bernese Oberland chain. On the other hand, in the Eastern Alps, it is generally necessary to cross three distinct ridges between the northern and southern plains, the Central ridge being the highest and most difficult to cross.  Thus the passes which crossed a single ridge, and did not involve too great a detour through a long valley of approach, became the most important and the most popular, e.g. the Mont Cenis, the Great St Bernard, the St Gotthard, the Septimer and the Brenner.

As time went on the Alpine passes were improved to make travel easier. A few passes (e.g. the Semmering, the Brenner, the Col de Tende and the Arlberg) had carriage roads constructed before 1800, while those over the Umbrail and the Great St Bernard were not completed till the early years of the 20th century.  Most of the carriage roads across the great alpine passes were thus constructed in the first half of the 19th century, largely due to the Napoleon's need for such roads as modes of military transport.  As late as 1905, the highest pass over the main chain that had a carriage road was the Great St Bernard, but three still higher passes over side ridges have roads—the col de l'Iseran, the Stelvio Pass, the Col du Galibier, in the Dauphiné Alps, and the Umbrail Pass.

Railway lines, like the Brenner and the Pontebba lines, were added to speed travel through the passes and tunnels supplemented passes at the Col de Tenda, the Mont Cenis, the Simplon and the St Gotthard.

See also
 Alps
 List of highest paved roads in Europe
 List of mountain passes
 List of mountain passes in Switzerland
 Valleys of the Alps

Notes

References

Further reading